St Andrews College is a dual-campus independent Roman Catholic co-educational secondary day school, located in , a western suburb of Sydney, New South Wales, Australia. The school provides education for students from Year 7 to Year 12. Founded in 1998, the college is a school of the Catholic Education Office of the Diocese of Parramatta.

History
St Andrews College was established in 1998 from the amalgamation of John Paul II Senior High School (founded in 1981) and Holy Family High School (1967–2010). The dual campus high school took its name from the local parish, St Andrew the Apostle. At the ARIA Music Awards of 2019, the college's Antonio Chiappetta won Music Teacher of the Year.

Structure
The school consists of two campus located within a kilometre of each other. The Holy Family (Junior) Campus serves education for years 7-10 while the John Paul (Senior) Campus serves education for year 11 & 12.

Principals
The college has had a number of principals since 1998. Below is a list of principals beginning in 2007.

See also 

 List of Catholic schools in New South Wales
 Catholic Education, Diocese of Parramatta
 Catholic education in Australia

References

Catholic secondary schools in Sydney
Roman Catholic Diocese of Parramatta
Educational institutions established in 1998
1998 establishments in Australia